British Office Taipei, formerly British Trade and Cultural Office (BTCO), is the representative office of the United Kingdom Government in Taiwan with a principal role to promote the British trade and investment interests. It functions as a de facto embassy in the absence of diplomatic relations between London and Taipei.

Its Taiwanese counterpart in London is the Taipei Representative Office in the U.K.

History

The office, then known as the British Trade and Cultural Office, was opened in October 1993. It succeeded the Anglo-Taiwan Trade Committee, a privately financed entity established in 1976, following the blank made by the withdraw of British Consulate in Tamsui in 1972. Unlike its predecessor, it could issue visas directly to people in Taiwan.

The British Council, which had taken over and expanded the functions of the private Anglo-Taiwan Education Centre, operated the Office's Cultural and Education Section.

On 26 May 2015, its name was changed to British Office Taipei to reflect the full scope of the office work, and the title of its head was changed from "Director General" to "Representative".

Principal officers

Heads of mission

Deputy heads of mission

Location
The office has been located in President International Tower (統一國際大樓) in Xinyi District on January 22, 2008. It is accessible within walking distance south of Taipei City Hall Station of the Taipei Metro.

See also
 List of diplomatic missions in Taiwan
 Taiwan–United Kingdom relations
 Foreign relations of the United Kingdom
 Foreign relations of Taiwan

References

External links

1993 establishments in Taiwan
Taipei
Representative Offices in Taipei
Organizations established in 1993
Taiwan–United Kingdom relations